The Man Behind 'The Times' is a 1917 British silent crime film directed by Frank Wilson and starring Stewart Rome, Chrissie White and Lionelle Howard.

Cast
 Stewart Rome as Aaron Moss  
 Chrissie White as Jet Overbury  
 Lionelle Howard as Allan Garth  
 Harry Gilbey as John Overbury  
 Charles Vane as John walcott 
 Mrs. Bedells as Mrs. Overbury  
 John MacAndrews as Doctor  
 Johnny Butt as Clerk

References

Bibliography
 Palmer, Scott. British Film Actors' Credits, 1895-1987. McFarland, 1988.

External links

1917 films
1917 crime films
British crime films
British silent feature films
Films directed by Frank Wilson
Films set in England
Hepworth Pictures films
British black-and-white films
1910s English-language films
1910s British films